Kukuyevka is a rural locality in Novoposelenovsky Selsoviet Rural Settlement, Kursky District, Kursk Oblast, Russia. Population:

Geography 
The village is located 81 km from the Russia–Ukraine border, 11 km south-west of Kursk, at the еаstern border of the selsoviet center – 1st Tsvetovo.

 Streets
There are the following streets in the locality: Beryozovaya, Chistaya, Dachny 1-y pereulok, Dachny 2-y pereulok, Dachny 3-y pereulok, Dachny 4-y pereulok, Dachny 5-y pereulok, Dachny 6-y pereulok, Dachny 7-y pereulok, Dachny 8-y pereulok, Dachny 9-y pereulok, Dachny 10-y pereulok, Dachny 11-y pereulok, Dorozhnaya, Gorodskaya, Iskristaya, Koltsevoy pereulok, Kochetovskaya, Krymskaya, Kurskaya, Lazurnaya, Lesnoy pereulok, Letnyaya, Lugovaya, Luchistaya, Magistralnaya, Mostovoy pereulok, Muzykalnaya, Naberezhnaya, Naberezhny pereulok, Narodnaya, Promyshlennaya, Promyshlenny pereulok, Razdolnaya, Rublevskaya, Rublevsky 1-y pereulok, Rublevsky 2-y pereulok, Rublevsky 3-y pereulok, Svetlaya, Sevastopolskaya, Selikhovskaya, Skazochnaya, Sportivnaya, Schastlivaya, Schastlivaya 2-ya, Shirokaya, Shkolnaya, Shosseynaya, Tsvetochny 1-y pereulok, Tsvetochny 2-y pereulok, Tsvetochny 3-y pereulok, Tsvetochny 4-y pereulok, Tsvetochny 5-y pereulok, Tsvetochny 6-y pereulok, Tsvetochny 7-y pereulok, Tsvetochny 8-y pereulok, Tsvetochny 9-y pereulok, Tsvetochny 10-y pereulok, Tsentralnaya, Tsentralny pereulok, Yagodnaya, Vesyolaya, Voronezhsky kvartal, Zapovednaya 1-ya, Zapovednaya 2-ya, Zapovednaya 3-ya, Zapovedny proyezd and Zapovedny pereulok (599 houses).

 Climate
Kukuyevka has a warm-summer humid continental climate (Dfb in the Köppen climate classification).

Transport 

The rural locality is situated 18 km from Kursk Vostochny Airport, 112 km from Belgorod International Airport and 215 km from Voronezh Peter the Great Airport.

References

Notes

Sources

Rural localities in Kursky District, Kursk Oblast